Łukasz Rajchelt (born 12 February 1999) is a Polish volleyball player, a member of Poland men's national under-19 volleyball team, U20 European Champion 2016.

Career

National team
On September 10, 2016, he achieved title of the 2016 CEV U20 European Champion after winning 7 of 7 matches in tournament and beating Ukraine U21 in the finale (3-1).

Sporting achievements

National team
 2016  CEV U20 European Championship

References

External links
 SMS PZPS Spała player profile

1999 births
Living people
Sportspeople from Łódź
Polish men's volleyball players